Anne Winters may refer to:

Anne Winters (poet), poet and professor at the University of Illinois at Chicago
Anne Winters (actress) (born 1994), American actress